LTTV may stand for:

 LTTng Viewer
 Lyons Township Television